Xinjiang Ba Yi Iron and Steel Co., Ltd. known as Ba Yi Iron & Steel or 8 1 Iron & Steel or August 1 Iron & Steel or BYIS or Bagang or Basteel, is a Chinese steel maker based in Ürümqi, Xinjiang. The company was a second-tier subsidiary of China Baowu Steel Group, via Ba Yi Iron and Steel Group (now known as "Baosteel Steel Group Xinjiang Ba Yi Iron and Steel Co., Ltd."). The rest of the shares of the company float in Shanghai Stock Exchange. Xinjiang government is the minority shareholder of the holding company: Ba Yi Iron and Steel Group.

History

Ba Yi Iron and Steel Group
The steel plant in Ürümqi was founded in 1951 by the People's Liberation Army (PLA). It was named "8 1" based on the date of the establishment of PLA on 1 August 1927. It was one of the 18 small-sized steel plants established in 18 provinces of China. Ba Yi Iron and Steel was one of the 512 important state-owned enterprises in 1997. (1 of 47 iron and steel industry)

It became a limited company after the marketization of China. A subsidiary was incorporated in 2000 to float the main steel manufacturing business in the stock exchange.

In 2007 Ba Yi Iron and Steel Group was renamed from "Xinjiang Ba Yi Iron and Steel Group Co., Ltd." to "Baosteel Group Xinjiang Ba Yi Iron and Steel Co., Ltd.". Baosteel Group acquired 69.56% stake of the company by injecting new share capital into the group (for ), diluting the stake of the State-owned Assets Supervision and Administration Commission (SASAC) of the People's Government of Xinjiang Uyghur Autonomous Region to 15%. Xinjiang SASAC also transferred their stake to their wholly owned subsidiary "Xinjiang Investment Development (Group) Co., Ltd." in the same year. In 2014 Ba Yi Iron and Steel Group was recapitalized again. The other shareholders of the group was China Huarong Asset Management for 7.95% stake and "Xinjiang Uyghur Autonomous Region Financing Guarantee Co., Ltd." for 0.12% stake.

Ba Yi Iron and Steel [Share]
Xinjiang Ba Yi Iron and Steel Co., Ltd. was incorporated in 2000. In 2002 the shares were floated in Shanghai Stock Exchange.

References

External links
 

Steel companies of China
Baowu
Companies based in Xinjiang
Ürümqi
Companies owned by the provincial government of China
Chinese companies established in 1995
Manufacturing companies established in 1959
1959 establishments in China
Chinese brands